EWH may refer to:

 Edinburgh World Heritage, an independent charity in Edinburgh, Scotland
 Engineering World Health, a medical and health organization based in Tennessee
 EWH, the Telegraph code for Dingyuan railway station, Chuzhou, Anhui, China